Ferdinand Gotthard Meinrad of Limburg Stirum, count of Limburg, "Fürst" von Styrum, sovereign lord zu Gemen, was born in 1701, son of Maximilian Wilhelm of Limburg Stirum.

He inherited the immediate lordship of Gemen at the death of his cousin the Prince-Bishop of Speyer, August Philipp of Limburg-Stirum-Gemen.

He married Katharina Karoline von Eptingen and they had one son, Ferdinand III, who died young.

Ferdinand I died in 1791 and Gemen passed to his nephew Karl Josef of Limburg Stirum.

1701 births
1801 deaths
Ferdinand 01